Susan Brawley is an American marine ecologist at the University of Maine known for her research on algae, especially algal reproduction. She was elected a fellow of the American Association for the Advancement of Science in 2012.

Education and career 
Brawley has a B.S. from Wellesley College (1973) and earned her Ph.D. in 1978 from the University of California, Berkeley. Following her Ph.D., she worked at the Smithsonian Institution and the University of Connecticut. In 1983, she joined Vanderbilt University as an assistant professor. In 1991, she moved to the University of Maine where she was promoted to professor in 1994.

Brawley was the Editor of the Journal of Phycology from 1996 until 2001. She was the president of the Phycological Society of America in 2011.

Research 

Brawley's early research examined the biology of the brown algae Fucus and macroalgal reproductive ecology, and the role of grazers in determining community structure on coral reefs. In the rocky intertidal zone, Brawley has modeled fertilization and the physical transport of gametes from algae. She has also tracked the movement of invasive species including periwinkles and the toothed wrack seaweed, Fucus serratus, where her research revealed that both originated from Ireland and Scotland and were likely carried in ballast rocks on ships that were moving materials across the Atlantic Ocean. Her research on electrical currents measured during the development of wild carrot, a flowering plant, revealed that the chemical indole-3-acetic acid rapidly stopped the current in the plant's cells. Brawley led the team examining the genome of the red algae Porphyra and the resulting research revealed how they survive by transporting nutrients, protecting themselves from light, and form cell walls. Brawley's research has implications for aquaculture and the new marketing of sea vegetables, including Ascophyllum, as a new cash crop in Maine.

Selected publications

Awards and honors 

 Award of Excellence, Phycological Society of America (2020)
 Fellow, American Association for the Advancement of Science (2012)

References 

Wellesley College alumni
University of California, Berkeley alumni
University of Maine faculty
Fellows of the American Association for the Advancement of Science
1951 births
Living people
Women phycologists
American marine biologists
American phycologists